The Safavid Empire was multi-ethnic and multi-religious. In the 17th century, Christians within the empire consisted primarily of three groups;

 Georgians belonging to the Georgian Orthodox Church
 Armenians belonging to the Armenian Apostolic Church
 Roman Catholics, consisting of European missionaries and recent converts (primarily Armenians)

See also
 Christianity in Iran
 Safavid Georgia
 Erivan Province (Safavid Empire)
 Safavid Karabakh

References

Sources
 
 

Safavid Iran
Christianity in Iran